The 2013–14 FC St. Pauli season was the 103rd season in the club's football history. In 2013–14, the club played in the 2. Bundesliga, the second tier of German football. It was the club's third consecutive season in the league, having played at this level since 2011–12, after it was relegated from the Bundesliga in 2012.

The club also took part in the 2013–14 edition of the DFB-Pokal, where it reached the second round and faced Bundesliga side VfB Stuttgart.

Matches

Legend

DFB-Pokal

2. Bundesliga

References

St. Pauli
FC St. Pauli seasons